The Bristol Blenheim is a British light bomber aircraft designed and built by the Bristol Aeroplane Company (Bristol) which was used extensively in the first two years of the Second World War, with examples still being used as trainers until the end of the war. Development began with the Type 142, a civil airliner, in response to a challenge from Lord Rothermere to produce the fastest commercial aircraft in Europe. The Type 142 first flew in April 1935, and the Air Ministry, impressed by its performance, ordered a modified design as the Type 142M for the Royal Air Force (RAF) as a bomber. Deliveries of the newly named Blenheim to RAF squadrons commenced on 10 March 1937. In service the Type 142M became the Blenheim Mk.I which would be developed into the longer Type 149, designated the Blenheim Mk.IV, except in Canada where Fairchild Canada built the Type 149 under licence as the Bolingbroke. The Type 160 Bisley was also developed from the Blenheim, but was already obsolete when it entered service.

In addition to operating as medium bombers, both versions were converted into heavy fighters by the addition of a gun pack with four Browning  machine guns mounted under the fuselage. The Mk.IV was also used as a maritime patrol aircraft and both aircraft were also used as bombing and gunnery trainers once they had become obsolete as combat aircraft.

The Blenheim was one of the first British aircraft with an all-metal stressed-skin construction, retractable landing gear, flaps, a powered gun turret and variable-pitch propellers. The Mk.I was faster than most of the RAF's biplane fighters in the late 1930s but advances soon left it vulnerable if flown in daylight, though it proved successful as a night fighter. The Blenheim was effective as a bomber but many were shot down. Both Blenheim types were used by foreign operators, and examples were licence built in Yugoslavia and Finland, in addition to Canada.

Development

Origins
In 1933 Frank Barnwell, Bristol's chief designer, went to the United States to collect first-hand information on their latest twin-engined, low-wing monoplane airliners. When he returned home he discussed one of them, the Lockheed Electra 12A, with Roy Fedden and prepared a design to match it using Fedden's Bristol Aquila engine which produced 500 hp, the same power as the engine used in the Electra. Sir Archibald Russell described Barnwell's design as "close to being a replica of the Electra". It was designated Type 135.
 
In early 1934, Lord Rothermere, owner of the Daily Mail newspaper, challenged the British aviation industry to build a high-speed aircraft capable of carrying six passengers and two crew members – he referred to the ambition as seeking "the fastest commercial aeroplane in Europe, if not the world". At the time, German firms were producing a variety of record-breaking high-speed designs, such as the single-engined Heinkel He 70, and Rothermere wanted the prestige of being able to claim to have the fastest civilian aircraft, as well as to purchase such an aircraft himself. Rothermere also intended to encourage businesses and key figures to make greater use of civil aviation, and to demonstrate to the British Air Ministry how their fighter aircraft may not be able to match modern transport aircraft, which may be easily converted to, or used as the basis for, a bomber aircraft.

By this point, proposed use of the Aquila engine had been shelved in favour of the supercharger-equipped, poppet-valve Bristol Mercury engine. Deeming it suitable for the issued challenge, the design of Type 135 was further adapted to produce the Type 142 in order to meet the requirements outlined by Rothermere. In late March 1934, Rothermere placed an order for a single Type 142 aircraft, under which he paid for half of the estimated £18,500 cost up front and the remainder upon the aircraft's first flight in the following year.

On 12 April 1935, the Type 142, which had been given the name Britain First, conducted its maiden flight from Filton Aerodrome, South Gloucestershire. Rothermere presented the aircraft to the nation for a formal evaluation as a potential bomber. By June 1935, the Air Ministry had become interested in the project due to its high performance. On 9 July 1935, a design conference was held by Bristol at the ministry's request into the question of converting the Type 142 into a suitable medium bomber.

Based upon talks from the conference, the Air Ministry quickly formalised Specification B.28/35 for prototypes of a bomber version; the Type 142M (M for military). One principal change between the Type 142M bomber and its Type 142 predecessor was the repositioning of the wing from a low-wing to a mid-wing position, which allowed for more internal space within the fuselage underneath the main spar to accommodate a sizable bomb bay. Other modifications included the addition of a bomb-aimer's position and a Browning machine gun in the nose along with provisions for a semi-retractable gun turret in the dorsal position.

Production

In September 1935, an initial contract for 150 aircraft was placed. The Air Ministry had chosen to order the type directly from the drawing board, having been urgently sought as one piece of a wider and rapid expansion of the RAF. The first aircraft built of this production model, K7033, served as the only prototype; on 25 June 1936, K7033 conducted its first flight from Filton. The service name for the aircraft became Blenheim Mk I after the famous battle during the War of the Spanish Succession. On 10 March 1937, production deliveries to the RAF formally started; 114 Squadron became the first squadron to receive the Blenheim. On 13 January 1938, the Blenheim entered service with No. 30 Squadron, the first overseas squadron to receive the type; in early 1939, the first Blenheims arrived in India.

From July 1936 onwards, various additional orders were placed for the Blenheim Mk I, including multiple orders for the export market. By the end of 1936, 1,568 aircraft were on order. In order to meet the demand, secondary assembly lines were established at Chadderton by Avro and at Speke by Rootes Securities. The aircraft was built under licence by foreign countries, including Finland, who completed a total of 55 aircraft, and Yugoslavia, which completed 16 aircraft with a further 24 in advanced stages of completion when Germany invaded Yugoslavia. Other countries also procured the Blenheim, including Romania, Greece and Turkey. By September 1939, orders for the Blenheim had risen to 2,088 aircraft. Total production of the Blenheim Mk I in England was 1,351 aircraft prior to the end of the production run in 1939; production had been terminated in favour of more advanced variants.

The Blenheim production programme saw several shifts in requirements and in capacity. A modified Blenheim design, given the name Bolingbroke, was manufactured under licence in Canada by Fairchild Aircraft. The Bolingbroke, which had been developed in response to Air Ministry Specification G.24/35 to procure a coastal reconnaissance/light bomber as a replacement for the Avro Anson, had substantial improvements that would serve as the basis for improved variants of the Blenheim. Both the navigator's station and range limitations of the Blenheim Mk.I had been subject to considerable criticism, prompting the development of an improved model to rectify the shortcomings. On 24 September 1937, an experimental Blenheim Mk.I, modified with an extended forward fuselage beyond its original stepless cockpit, smooth-fronted nose enclosure, made its first flight from Filton.

Further development
Only one Blenheim Mk II was completed, as flight tests revealed the increase in speed to be marginal and not warranting further development. Another modification resulted in the Blenheim Mk III, which lengthened the nose, dispensing with the "stepless cockpit" format of the Mk.I, introducing a true windscreen in front of the pilot, to provide more room for the bomb aimer. This required the nose to be "scooped out" in front of the pilot to maintain visibility during takeoff and landing. The turret acquired a pair of Brownings in place of the original single Vickers K gun, creating the Blenheim Mk IV.

In early 1939, the first batch of Blenheim Mk IVs were accepted into service; these lacked outer fuel tanks but were accepted due to the urgent demand for the type. Early Blenheim Mk IVs were also equipped with the Mercury VIII engine, most were fitted with the more powerful Mercury XV or Mercury 25 models. Further aircraft deliveries were made to the production standard and were primarily manufactured by Avro and Rootes. Production of the Blenheim IV continued until June 1943, when newcomers such as the Beaufort-derived Beaufighter had succeeded the type. A total of 3,307 were produced.

A long-range fighter version, the Blenheim Mk IF, was also developed. For this role, about 200 Blenheims were fitted with a gun pack under the fuselage for four  Brownings. Later, the Airborne Intercept (AI) Mk III or IV radar was fitted to some aircraft in use as night fighters; these were the first British fighters to be equipped with radar. The Blenheim had been selected as the first aircraft to be adapted for this role as its fuselage was sufficiently roomy to accommodate the additional crew member and radar apparatus. Their performance was marginal as a fighter but they served as an interim type pending availability of the more capable Beaufighter derivative. About 60 Mk IVs were also equipped with the gun pack as the Mk IVF and were used by Coastal Command to protect convoys from German long-range bombers.

The last bomber variant was conceived as an armoured ground attack aircraft, with a solid nose containing four more Browning machine guns. The Mk V was ordered for conventional bombing operations, with the removal of armour and most of the glazed nose section. The Mk V (Type 160) was used primarily in the Middle East and Far East. The Blenheim served as the basis for the Beaufort torpedo bomber, which led to the Beaufighter, with the lineage performing two evolutions of bomber-to-fighter.

Design

Each engine drove a three-bladed controllable-pitch propeller, and were equipped with both hand-based and electric engine starters. To ease maintenance, the engine mountings were designed with a split-segment to facilitate rapid engine removal without disturbing the carburettors. A pair of fuel tanks, each containing up to 140 gallons, were housed within the centre-section of the fuselage.

The fuselage of the Blenheim employed a light-alloy monocoque structure using open-section stringers, and was constructed in three sections. The wing is also built in three sections, the centre-section of which is bolted and rivetted to the fuselage. The outer wing sections are tapered in chord and thickness. Extensive use of Alclad sheeting is made in elements such as the ribs, skin, flaps, and web reinforcement of the spars. The tail unit is of a cantilever monoplane style, using an all-metal tailplane and fin while the aerodynamically-balanced rudder and elevators use a metal frame covered with fabric. The undercarriage was hydraulically-retracted, with an auxiliary hand-pump for emergency actuation; medium-pressure tyres were used, complete with pneumatically-actuated differentially-control brakes.

The Blenheim typically carried a crew of three – pilot, navigator/bombardier and wireless (radio) operator/air gunner. The pilot's quarters on the left side of the nose were so cramped that the control yoke obscured all flight instruments while engine instruments eliminated the forward view on landings. Most secondary instruments were arranged along the left side of the cockpit, essential items such as the propeller pitch control were actually placed behind the pilot where they had to be operated by feel alone. The navigator/bombardier was seated alongside the pilot, and made use of a sliding/folding seat whilst performing the bomb aiming role. Dual flight controls could be installed. The wireless operator/air gunner was housed aft of the wing alongside the aircraft's dorsal gun turret.

Armament comprised a single forward-firing  Browning machine gun outboard of the port engine and a  Lewis Gun in a semi-retracting Bristol Type B Mk I dorsal turret firing to the rear. From 1939 onwards, the Lewis gun was replaced by the more modern  Vickers VGO machine gun. A  bomb load could be carried in the internal bomb bay set into the centre section of the fuselage. Like most contemporary British aircraft, the bomb bay doors were kept closed with bungee cords and opened under the weight of the released bombs. Because there was no way to predict how long it would take for the bombs to force the doors open, bombing accuracy was consequently poor. The bomb bay could be loaded using a hand-operated winch incorporated into the fuselage.

To achieve its relatively high speed, the Blenheim used a very small fuselage cross-section, with its upper front glazing all at one angle in the form of a "stepless cockpit" that used no separate windscreen panels for the pilot, a notable feature of a substantial majority of German bomber designs, first conceived during the war years. Both fixed and sliding window panels were present, along with a transparent sliding roof. Other onboard equipment included a radio, cameras, navigation systems, electric lighting, oxygen apparatus, and stowage for parachutes and clothing.

Operational history

Outbreak of war

In September 1939, the month in which the Second World War broke out, the Blenheim Mk I equipped two home-based squadrons and 11 overseas squadrons in locations such as Egypt, Aden, Iraq, India, and Singapore. Further RAF squadrons had received, or were in the process of converting to, the more capable Blenheim Mk IV; 168 Blenheim Mk IV aircraft had entered RAF operational strength by the outbreak of war.

On the day that war was declared on Germany, a Blenheim Mk IV, N6215, piloted by Flying Officer Andrew McPherson was the first British aircraft to cross the German coast to perform a high altitude reconnaissance mission upon the German Navy in the vicinity of Wilhelmshaven, Lower Saxony. The following morning, 15 Blenheims from three squadrons set off on one of the first bombing missions to attack the ships spotted on the previous day. The raid was a failure, only nine aircraft attacked, and only superficial damage was done to the cruiser Emden, when one of No. 107 Squadron's Blenheims crashed into the cruiser, killing 11 crewmen. RAF Coastal Command were soon using the Blenheim with the stated mission of protecting British shipping convoys off the east coast.

Shortly after the conflict's start, the RAF Advanced Air Striking Force (AASF) was deployed to numerous airfields in France, allowing for shorter range bombing missions against German targets, including industries. Several squadrons of Blenheim IVs were assigned to the AASF, being frequently used against targets in France and the Low Countries once the Battle of France had begun. Blenheims were also assigned to the air component of the British Expeditionary Force of the Army.

In May 1940, AASF and BEF Blenheims participated in the Battle of France, being sent against German forces moving towards Brussels, resulting in many aircraft quickly sustaining heavy damage or being lost to enemy fire. German attacks upon the French airfields also damaged a considerable number of Blenheims on the ground. On 14 May, a combined force of Fairey Battles and Blenheims was dispatched on a counter-attack upon German forces as they broke through defensive lines: 40 out of 71 aircraft were lost in this sortie. This is claimed to be the highest ever losses known to the RAF. Further action by Blenheims of Bomber Command that day sustained a 25% aircraft loss despite a high level of British fighter cover. Shortly thereafter, the mostly-depleted squadrons were withdrawn to Britain. Around 50 Blenheims supported the Dunkirk evacuation by harassing enemy forces.

Rapid advances in technology which had taken place in the late 1930s had rendered the Blenheim mostly obsolete by the outbreak of the war. In particular, it had become heavier as extra service equipment was installed; much of this was found to be necessary through operational experience. This, coupled with the rapid performance increases of the fighters that would oppose it, had eclipsed the Blenheim's speed advantage. In January 1941, the Air Staff classified the Blenheim as inadequate in terms of performance and armament for current operations.

The light armament was seldom able to deter fighter opposition. Squadrons were forced to use several different improvisations in an attempt to provide better defensive armament, until officially sanctioned modifications were able to be introduced in early 1940. The Blenheim also proved to be vulnerable to anti-aircraft artillery, especially around the rear fuselage. Flexible, self-sealing liners had been fitted to the fuel tanks but they were still not fully protected against the  MG FF cannon carried by the Luftwaffes Bf 109 and Bf 110 fighters.

Home front
Blenheim squadrons were still in immediate and high demand after their withdrawal from France as part of the British action during the Norwegian campaign. Typically operating from bases in the northern areas of the British mainland, such as RAF Lossiemouth, flying for extended periods over the North Sea led to the weather posing almost as much of a risk as enemy combatants, particularly as most of the Blenheim IVs lacked any heating or deicing systems; in response, some aircraft were later equipped with boilers fixed onto the starboard engine exhaust. A sizeable number of losses occurred, caused by both enemy action and mid-air engine failures due to icing.

After the fall of France in June 1940, the Free French Air Force was formed at RAF Odiham, Hampshire, in the form of Groupe Mixte de Combat (GMC) 1, consisting of a mixed bag of Blenheims and Westland Lysander liaison/observation aircraft, which were later dispatched to North Africa and saw action against Italian and German forces.

Blenheim units operated throughout the Battle of Britain, often taking heavy casualties, although they were never accorded the publicity of the fighter squadrons. From July to December 1940, Blenheims raided German-occupied airfields both in daylight and at night. Although most of these raids were unproductive, there were some successes; on 1 August five out of twelve Blenheims sent to attack Haamstede and Evere (Brussels) were able to bomb, destroying or heavily damaging three Bf 109s of II./JG 27 and apparently killing a Staffelkapitän identified as Hauptmann Albrecht von Ankum-Frank. Two other 109s were claimed by Blenheim gunners. Another successful raid on Haamstede was made by a single Blenheim on 7 August which destroyed one 109 of 4./JG 54, heavily damaged another, and caused lighter damage to four more.

There were also some missions which produced an almost 100% casualty rate amongst the Blenheims. One such operation was mounted on 13 August 1940 against a Luftwaffe airfield near Aalborg in north-western Denmark by twelve aircraft of 82 Squadron. One Blenheim returned early (the pilot was later charged but was killed on another operation before a court martial was held); the other eleven, which reached Denmark, were shot down, five by flak and six by Bf 109s. Blenheim units had also been formed to carry out long-range strategic reconnaissance missions over Germany and German-occupied territories. In this role, the Blenheims once again proved to be too slow and vulnerable against Luftwaffe fighters and they took constant casualties.

On 12 August 1941, an action described by The Daily Telegraph in 2006 as being the "RAF's most audacious and dangerous low-level bombing raid, a large-scale attack against power stations near Cologne" took place. The raid was a low-level daylight raid by 54 Blenheims under the command of Wing Commander Nichol of No. 114 Squadron RAF. They hit their targets (Fortuna Power Station in Oberaußem-Fortuna and the Goldenberg Power Station in Hürth-Knapsack), but twelve of the Blenheims were lost during the raid, 22% of those that took part, which was far above the sustainable loss rate of less than 5%. The England cricketer Squadron leader Bill Edrich was awarded the DFC for his part in the raid.

From 5 September 1940 Blenheims of Bomber Command began a bombing campaign targeting German-occupied ports along the English Channel, alongside heavier bomber types. Bomber Command Blenheims also performed anti-shipping patrols due to Coastal Command's own strike squadrons being heavily depleted throughout the latter half of 1940. On 11 March 1940, a Blenheim IV, P4852, became the first RAF aircraft to sink a U-boat, having scored two direct hits on U-31 in the Schillig Roads. In April 1941, a campaign aiming to completely close off the Channel to enemy shipping was launched using an initial flight of Blenheims stationed at RAF Manston. Between April and June that year, a total of 297 Blenheims of No 2. Group attacked German shipping at sea, losing 36 aircraft, while Coastal Command launched 143 attacks in the same period, losing 52 aircraft; by the end of the year, 698 ships had been attacked and 41 of these sunk for the loss of 123 aircraft.

Fighter operations

The Bristol Blenheim was used by both Bomber and Fighter Commands. About two hundred Mk I bombers were modified into Mk IF long-range fighters with 600 (Auxiliary Air Force) Squadron, based at Hendon, the first squadron to take delivery in September 1938. By 1939, at least seven squadrons were operating them as fighters, increasing to about 60 squadrons within a few months. The Mk IF proved to be slower and less manoeuvrable than expected, and by June 1940 daylight Blenheim losses caused concern for Fighter Command. The Mk IF was relegated mainly to night fighter duties where No. 23 Squadron RAF, which had already operated them at night, soon relegated them to night intruder operations as they were not effective as night fighters.

In the German night-bombing raid on London on 18 June 1940, Blenheims accounted for five German bombers, thus proving that they were better-suited for night fighting. In July, No. 600 Squadron, by then based at RAF Manston, had some of its Mk IFs equipped with AI Mk III radar. With this radar equipment, a Blenheim from the Fighter Interception Unit (FIU) at RAF Ford achieved the first success on the night of 2–3 July 1940, accounting for a Dornier Do 17 bomber.  The Blenheim was replaced by the faster and more heavily-armed Bristol Beaufighter in 1940–1941.

Mediterranean and Middle East

On 11 June 1940, only hours after Italy's entry into the war on Germany's side, several Blenheim IVs bombed Italian positions. In mid-1940, reinforcement ferry routes were established throughout Africa, starting in Takoradi on the Gold Coast. By the end of 1940, a total of three RAF squadrons equipped with Blenheim IV aircraft were performing anti-shipping, bombing, and reconnaissance missions in support of Allied ground forces in North Africa.

By July 1941, it had been recognised that, in response to the increasing intensity of combat in North Africa and in the Middle East theatres, additional squadrons were urgently required. In the latter half of 1941, several Blenheim squadrons were flown out to Malta, many being stationed there into early 1942 before mainly being absorbed in the Western Desert air operations. As Bomber Command gradually took Blenheims out of the Northern Europe theatre, they were often dispatched to other areas such as North Africa. Upon the outbreak of the Pacific War in December 1941, some Blenheim squadrons in the Middle East were relocated from the theatre to the Far East in response to the new threat from Japanese forces.

South East Asia

Blenheims continued to operate widely in many combat roles until about 1943, equipping RAF squadrons in the UK and at British bases in Aden, India, British Malaya, Singapore, and the Dutch East Indies. Many Blenheims were lost to Japanese fighters during the Malayan Campaign and the battles for Singapore and Sumatra. By that point, the traditional daylight light bomber role was more effectively carried out by suitable fighter-bombers, and the surviving examples were relegated to training duties. Nonetheless, the Blenheim played a role in preventing India from falling and in recapturing Burma, destroying over 60 aircraft on the ground in raids on Bangkok early in the campaign.

One Blenheim pilot, Squadron Leader Arthur Scarf, was posthumously awarded the Victoria Cross for an attack on Singora, Thailand, on 9 December 1941. Another bomber of No. 60 Squadron RAF was credited with shooting down Lt Col Tateo Katō's Nakajima Ki-43 fighter and badly damaging two others in a single engagement on 22 May 1942, over the Bay of Bengal. Katō's death was a severe blow to the Imperial Japanese Army Air Force.

The Air Ministry's replacement for the Blenheim as a daylight bomber, another Bristol design, the Buckingham, was overtaken by events and changes in requirements, and considered inferior to the de Havilland Mosquito, and as such did not see combat. The final ground-attack version – the Blenheim Mk V – first equipped 139 Squadron in June 1942.  Eventually thirteen squadrons – mainly in the Middle East and Far East – received this variant but operated them generally only for a few months.

First attack on the Japanese carrier force in the Pacific War
On 9 April 1942, nine Blenheims from the 11 Squadron RAF attacked Admiral Chuichi Nagumo's Kidō Butai; the Imperial Japanese main carrier battle group. The Blenheims approached undetected by the A6M2 Zero combat air patrol (CAP) fighters, resulting in a total surprise-attack upon the Japanese carrier battle group. Four of the Blenheims were shot down over the carriers by CAP Zeroes (two of which were claimed by ace-fighter pilot Kaname Harada from the Soryu), and by other Japanese aircraft returning from the earlier-strike on HMS Hermes. This was the first time a Japanese carrier force had faced a concerted air attack in the Pacific War.

Finland

In 1936, the Finnish Air Force became the first export customer for the Blenheim, ordering 18 Blenheim Mk Is, which were delivered from Britain between June 1937 and July 1938. Two years later, Finland obtained a manufacturing licence for the Blenheim. Before any aircraft could be manufactured at the Valtion lentokonetehdas (State Aeroplane Factory) in Finland, the Winter War broke out, forcing the Finns to order more aircraft from the UK. A further 24 British-manufactured Blenheims were ordered during the Winter War and were delivered from the RAF's own stocks.

In the aftermath of the Winter War, 55 Blenheims were constructed in Finland, the final aircraft being completed in September 1944; this brought the total number of Blenheims in Finnish service to 97 (75 Mk Is and 22 Mk IVs).<ref name="Backwoods">Perttula, Pentti.(1999) [https://web.archive.org/web/20010331180939/http://www.sci.fi/~ambush/faf/blenheim.html Bristol Blenheim."] Backwoods Landing Strip: Finnish Air Force Aircraft, FAF in Colour. Retrieved: 27 June 2009.</ref> The Finns also received 20 half-completed ex-Yugoslavian Mk IV Blenheims captured by Germany, together with manufacturing tools, production equipment, and a huge variety of spare parts, although some of these had been damaged or otherwise destroyed through sabotage. Yugoslavia had ceased production of the Mk I and commenced a production run of Mk IVs just prior to the April 1941 invasion. The British-made Blenheims had RAF green interiors, RAF seat belts and instruments on imperial units, while Finnish-made Blenheims had medium grey interiors, Finnish-style seat belts and metric instruments.

The Finnish Blenheims flew 423 missions during the Winter War, and close to 3,000 missions during the Continuation War and Lapland War. Blenheim machine-gunners also shot down eight Soviet aircraft. Thirty-seven Blenheims were lost in combat during the wars.

The Finnish Blenheims were divided on six series (sarja):

Series I (BL-104..BL-121): 18 British-made Blenheim I bombers with doorless bomb bays. Arrived in 1938
Series II (BL-146..BL-160): 15 Finnish-made Blenheim I bombers with deepened bomb bay doors. In service by 1941.
Series III (BL-122..BL-133): 12 British-made Blenheim IV bombers ("long-noses"). Arrived in January 1940.
Series IV (BL-134..BL-145): 12 British-made Blenheim I bombers. Arrived in February 1940.
Series V (BL-161..BL-190): 30 Finnish-made Blenheim I bombers. In service by 1943.
Series VI (BL-196..BL-205): 10 Finnish-made Blenheim IV bombers. In service by 1944.
Series VII (BL-191..BL-195): six Finnish-made Blenheim I bombers, was cancelled in 1944.

The bomb bays, bomb bay doors and bomb racks of various series were modified on major overhauls to host bigger bombs.Keskinen, Kalevi, Stenman, Kari: Suomen Ilmavoimien Historia 10: Bristol Blenheim, 2004

After the war, Finland was prohibited from flying bomber aircraft by the Paris Peace Treaty, with Finland's Blenheims being placed into storage in 1948. However, in 1951, five Blenheims were re-activated for use as target tugs, with the last flight of a Finnish Blenheim taking place on 20 May 1958.

The usual nickname of Blenheim in the Finnish Air Force was Pelti-Heikki ("Tin Henry").

Variants

Blenheim Mk.I  Three-seat twin-engined light bomber, powered by two  Bristol Mercury VIII radial piston engines, armed with a  machine gun in the port wing, plus a  Vickers K gun in the dorsal turret, maximum bombload . 1,552 built. Company designation Type 142M.
Blenheim Mk.IF  Night fighter version, equipped with an AI Mk III or Mk IV airborne interceptor radar, armed with four  machine guns in a special gun pack under the fuselage. About 200 Blenheim Mk Is were converted into Mk IF night fighters.
Blenheim Mk.II  Long-range reconnaissance version with extra fuel tankage. One built.
Blenheim Mk.III  Prototype for Mk.IV with lengthened nose.
Blenheim Mk.IV/Bolingbroke I Improved version, fitted with protective armour and extended nose, powered by two  Bristol Mercury XV radial piston engines, armed with a  machine gun in the port wing, plus two  machine-guns in a powered operated dorsal turret, and two remotely controlled rearward-firing  machine guns mounted beneath the nose, maximum bombload  internally and  externally. 3,307 built. Company designation Type 149
Blenheim Mk.IVF  Long-range fighter version, armed with four  machine guns in special gun pack under the fuselage. About 60 Blenheim Mk IVs were converted into Mk IVF fighters.
Blenheim Mk.V/Bisley Mk.I High-altitude bomber, powered by two Bristol Mercury XV or XXV radial piston engines. Company designation Type 160

Operators

 Canada

Surviving aircraft

In Finland, the sole surviving original Blenheim in the world, a Mk IV registered as BL-200 of the Finnish Air Force, has been completely restored and is now on display at the Aviation Museum of Central Finland at Tikkakoski.

An airworthy Blenheim was rebuilt from a scrapped Bolingbroke over a 12-year period, only to crash at an airshow at Denham within a month of completion in 1987.

A replacement Bolingbroke Mk IVT was rebuilt to flying status over five years and painted to represent a Blenheim Mk IV in RAF wartime service. It began flying at air shows and exhibitions in the UK in May 1993, and was used in the 1995 film version of Shakespeare's Richard III. This aircraft crashed on landing at Duxford on 18 August 2003, but after extensive repair and conversion to the Mark I "Short nose" version by The Aircraft Restoration Company (ARC) at Duxford, was displayed to the public on 30 May 2014, and flew again, for 29 minutes, on 20 November 2014, following restoration at the Imperial War Museum Duxford, Cambridgeshire, England. The aircraft appeared in the 2017 Christopher Nolan film Dunkirk.

In summer 1996, a Bristol Blenheim Mk IVF was recovered from the sea, a few kilometres off Rethymnon, Crete. The aircraft belonged to No. 203 Squadron RAF and was downed by friendly fire on 28 April 1941. The Blenheim was moved to the Hellenic Air Force Museum for restoration.

The Kent Battle of Britain Museum in Hawkinge has begun a project to build a Blenheim IVF using the remains of four Bristol Bolingbrokes. The Aircraft Restoration Company (ARC) provided the left-over parts from its own Blenheim restoration.

The Royal Museum of the Armed Forces and Military History in Brussels exhibits a Bolingbroke painted as a No. 139 Squadron RAF Blenheim XD-A that crash landed in May 1940 in Belgium

Specifications (Blenheim Mk IV)

See also

References
Citations

Articles

Bibliography
 Air Ministry Pilot's Notes: Blenheim. London: OHMS/Air Data Publications, 1939.
 Air Ministry Pilot's Notes: Blenheim V. London: OHMS/Air Data Publications, 1942.

 Barnes, C.H. Bristol Aircraft Since 1910. London: Putnam, 1970. .
 Boiten, T. Bristol Blenheim. Ramsbury, Marlborough, Wiltshire, UK: The Crowood Press, 1998. .
 Bowyer, C. Bristol Blenheim. London: Ian Allan, 1984. .
 Chorley, W.R. RAF Bomber Command Losses of the Second World War: 1939–40 v. 1. Earl Shilton, Leicester, UK: Midland Publishing, 1998. .
 Ciglić, Boris and Dragan Savić. Croatian Aces of World War II (Osprey Aircraft of the Aces – 49). London: Oxford, 2002. .
 Donald, David. The Complete Encyclopedia of World Aircraft. New York: Barnes & Noble, 1997. .
 Falconer, Jonathon. The Bomber Command Handbook 1939–1945. Stroud, UK: Sutton Publishing Limited, 1998. .
 Frith, David. Pageant of Cricket. Melbourne: The Macmillan Company of Australia, 1987. .

 Keskinen, Kalevi et al. Suomen Ilmavoimien Historia 10, Bristol Blenheim (in Finnish). Loviisa, Finland: Painoyhtymä Oy, 2004. .
 Jefford, C.G. RAF Squadrons: A Comprehensive Record of the Movement and Equipment of All RAF Squadrons and Their Antecedents Since 1912.  Shrewsbury, UK: Airlife Publishing, 2nd edition, 2001. .
 Lake, Jon. Blenheim Squadrons of World War 2. Oxford, UK: Osprey Publishing, 1998. .

 Mackay, Ron. Bristol Blenheim in Action. Carrollton, Texas: Squadron/Signal Publications, 1998. .
 March, Daniel J., ed. British Warplanes of World War II. London: Aerospace, 1998. .
 Marttila, Jukka. Bristol Blenheim – Taitoa ja tekniikkaa (in Finnish). Vantaa, Finland: Blenimi-Publishing, 1989. .
 Mason, Francis K. The British Bomber Since 1914. London: Putnam Aeronautical Books, 1994. .
 Mondey, David. The Hamlyn Concise Guide to American Aircraft of World War II. London: Aerospace Publishing Ltd, 1996. .
 Moyes, Philip J.R. The Bristol Blenheim I (Aircraft in Profile 93). Leatherhead, Surrey, UK: Profile Publications, 1966.

 Oughton, James D. Bristol Blenheim Mk.IV (Aircraft in Profile 218). Leatherhead, Surrey, UK: Profile Publications Ltd., 1971.

 Sakaida, Henry. Japanese Army Air Force Aces 1937–45. Oxford, UK: Osprey Publishing, 1997. .
 
 Stenman, Kari. "Staying Power: The Bristol Blenheim in Finnish Service". Air Enthusiast, No. 54, Summer 1994. pp. 26–35. 
 Thomas, A. Bristol Blenheim (Warpaint No. 26). London: Hall Park Books, 2000. .
 Warner, Graham. The Bristol Blenheim: A Complete History. London: Crécy Publishing, 2nd edition 2005. .
 Warner, Graham. "Spirit of Britain First: A Pictorial Tribute to Britain's Airworthy Blenheim". Air Enthusiast, No. 65, September–October 1996, pp. 68–69. .
 Wheeler, Barry C. The Hamlyn Guide to Military Aircraft Markings.'' London: Chancellor Press, 1992. .

External links

 RAF Bristol Blenheim history
 No. 211 Squadron RAF
 Blenheim Society
 Aircraft Restoration Company
 Finnish Mk IV Blenheim restoration
 "Up in the Blenheim, a civilian pilot's impressions..."; Flight, 24 June 1937
 "How the Bristol Blenheims are erected"; Aircraft Engineer (supplement to Flight), 19 May 1938
 "In the air IV – Flying the Blenheim"; Flight, 15 November 1945

Blenheim
1930s British bomber aircraft
1930s British fighter aircraft
World War II British bombers
World War II British night fighter aircraft
Mid-wing aircraft
Aircraft first flown in 1935
Twin piston-engined tractor aircraft
World War II aircraft of Finland